The Seal of the Generalitat de Catalunya is the symbol that represents the Generalitat de Catalunya institutions and related organs.

It was designed by Bartomeu Llongueras during the Second Spanish Republic. Traditionally, the St George's Cross had been used as the Generalitat's seal.

After Spain's transition to democracy and the restoration of Catalonia's self-government, it was reinstated, albeit in a slightly modified version, in order to avoid confusion when placing the seal upside down (described by statute in 1981, decree 7/1981).

In some situations, a bicolour version is preferred, instead of the traditional tricolour one.

See also
Seal (emblem)
St George's Cross

References

Government of Catalonia